Robert Kagan (born September 26, 1958) is an American neoconservative scholar, critic of U.S. foreign policy, and a leading advocate of liberal interventionism.

A co-founder of the neoconservative Project for the New American Century, he is a senior fellow at the Brookings Institution. Kagan has been a foreign policy adviser to U.S. Republican presidential candidates as well as Democratic administrations via the Foreign Affairs Policy Board. He writes a monthly column on world affairs for The Washington Post. During the 2016 U.S. presidential election campaign, Kagan left the Republican Party due to the party's nomination of  Donald Trump and endorsed the Democratic candidate, Hillary Clinton, for president.

Personal life and education
Kagan was born in Athens, Greece. His father, historian Donald Kagan, the Sterling Professor of Classics and History Emeritus at Yale University and a specialist in the history of the Peloponnesian War, was of Lithuanian Jewish descent. His brother, Frederick, is a military historian and author. Kagan has a BA in history (1980) from Yale, where in 1979 he had been Editor-in-Chief of the Yale Political Monthly, a periodical he is credited with reviving. He later earned a Master of Public Policy from Harvard's Kennedy School of Government and a PhD in American history from American University in Washington, D.C.

Kagan is married to American diplomat Victoria Nuland, who served as deputy national security advisor to Vice President Dick Cheney and Under Secretary of State for Political Affairs in the Biden administration since April 2021, and previously as Assistant Secretary of State for European and Eurasian Affairs in the Barack Obama administration. Nuland held the rank of Career Ambassador, the highest diplomatic rank in the United States Foreign Service. She is noted for her criticism of Russian policies.

Ideas and career
In 1983, Kagan was foreign policy advisor to New York Republican Representative Jack Kemp. From 1984 to 1986, under the administration of Ronald Reagan, he was a speechwriter for Secretary of State George P. Shultz and a member of the United States Department of State Policy Planning Staff. From 1986 to 1988, he served in the State Department Bureau of Inter-American Affairs.

In 1997, Kagan co-founded the now-defunct neoconservative think tank Project for the New American Century with William Kristol. Through the work of the PNAC, from 1998, Kagan was an early and strong advocate of military action in Syria, Iran, Afghanistan as well as to "remove Mr. Hussein and his regime from power". After the 1998 bombing of Iraq was announced Kagan said "bombing Iraq isn't enough" and called on Clinton to send ground troops to Iraq. In January 2002, Kagan and Kristol falsely claimed in a Weekly Standard article that Saddam Hussein was supporting the "existence of a terrorist training camp in Iraq, complete with a Boeing 707 for practicing hijackings, and filled with non-Iraqi radical Muslims". Kagan and Kristol further alleged that the September 11 hijacker Mohamed Atta met with an Iraqi intelligence official several months before the attacks. The allegations were later shown to be false.

From 1998 until August 2010, Kagan was a Senior Associate with the Carnegie Endowment for International Peace. He was appointed senior fellow in the Center on United States and Europe at the Brookings Institution in September 2010.

During the 2008 presidential campaign he served as foreign policy advisor to John McCain, the Republican Party's nominee for President of the United States in the 2008 election.

Since 2011, Kagan has also served on the 25-member State Department's Foreign Affairs Policy Board under Secretaries of State Hillary Clinton and John Kerry.

Andrew Bacevich referred to Kagan as "the chief neoconservative foreign-policy theorist" in reviewing Kagan's book The Return of History and the End of Dreams.

A profile in The Guardian described Kagan as being "uncomfortable" with the 'neocon' title, and stated that "he insists he is 'liberal' and 'progressive' in a distinctly American tradition".

In 2008, Kagan wrote an article titled "Neocon Nation: Neoconservatism, c. 1776" for World Affairs, describing the main components of American neoconservatism as a belief in the rectitude of applying US moralism to the world stage, support for the US to act alone, the promotion of American-style liberty and democracy in other countries, the belief in American hegemony, the confidence in US military power, and a distrust of international institutions. According to Kagan, his foreign-policy views are "deeply rooted in American history and widely shared by Americans".

In 2006, Kagan wrote that Russia and China are the greatest "challenge liberalism faces today": "Nor do Russia and China welcome the liberal West's efforts to promote liberal politics around the globe, least of all in regions of strategic importance to them. ... Unfortunately, al-Qaeda may not be the only challenge liberalism faces today, or even the greatest." In a February 2017 essay for Foreign Policy, Kagan argued that U.S. post-Cold War retrenchment in global affairs has emboldened Russia and China, "the two great revisionist powers," and will eventually lead to instability and conflict.

In October 2018, Kagan said: "Unless are you willing to punish" Saudi Arabia for the assassination of Jamal Khashoggi, "then they own you."

Writings
Kagan is a columnist for The Washington Post. He has also written for The New York Times, Foreign Affairs, The Wall Street Journal, Commentary, World Affairs, and Policy Review.

Regarding Kagan's July 2000 opinion piece "Problem with Powell", Guy Roberts stated that "PNAC co-founder Robert Kagan sought to explain core differences" between the positions of the neoconservatives and those of Colin Powell. In that piece, Kagan wrote, 
Clarence Lusane has described Kagan as blaming Powell "for Saddam Hussein remaining in power" in the Washington Post piece.

In a subsequent opinion piece "Spotlight on Colin Powell" (The Philadelphia Inquirer, February 12, 2002) Kagan praised Powell for "[a]rticulately defending the new Bush Doctrine" and declaring "his support for 'regime change' in Iraq".

In 2003, Kagan's book Of Paradise and Power: America and Europe in the New World Order, published on the eve of the US invasion of Iraq, created something of a sensation through its assertions that Europeans tended to favor peaceful resolutions of international disputes while the United States takes a more "Hobbesian" view in which some kinds of disagreement can only be settled by force, or, as he put it:  "Americans are from Mars and Europe is from Venus."  A New York Times book reviewer, Ivo H. Daalder wrote:

In Dangerous Nation: America's Place in the World from its Earliest Days to the Dawn of the Twentieth Century (2006) Kagan argued forcefully against what he considers the widespread misconception that the United States had been isolationist since its inception. Dangerous Nation was awarded the 2007 Lepgold Prize by Georgetown University.

Kagan's essay "Not Fade Away: The Myth of American Decline" (The New Republic, February 2, 2012) was very positively received by President Obama. Josh Rogin reported in Foreign Policy that the president "spent more than 10 minutes talking about it...going over its arguments paragraph by paragraph." The essay was excerpted from Kagan's book, The World America Made (2012).

John Bew and Kagan lectured on March 27, 2014, on Realpolitik and American exceptionalism at the Library of Congress.

Criticism of Donald Trump 
In February 2016, Kagan publicly left the Republican party (referring to himself as a "former Republican") and endorsed Democrat Hillary Clinton for president and argued that the Republican Party's "wild obstructionism" and an insistence that "government, institutions, political traditions, party leadership and even parties themselves" were things meant to be "overthrown, evaded, ignored, insulted, laughed at" set the stage for the rise of Donald Trump. Kagan called Trump a "Frankenstein monster" and also compared him to Napoleon.  In May 2016, Kagan wrote an opinion piece in The Washington Post regarding Trump's campaign entitled "This Is How Fascism Comes to America". Kagan has said that "all Republican foreign policy professionals are anti-Trump." In September 2021, Kagan wrote a related opinion essay published in The Washington Post by the title, "Our Constitutional Crisis Is Already Here".

Select bibliography
 A Twilight Struggle: American Power and Nicaragua, 1977-1990. (1996) 
 Present Dangers: Crisis and Opportunity in America's Foreign and Defense Policy, with William Kristol (2000)
 Of Paradise and Power: America and Europe in the New World Order. (2003) 
 Dangerous Nation: America's Place in the World from its Earliest Days to the Dawn of the Twentieth Century. (2006) 
 The Return of History and the End of Dreams. (2008) 
 The World America Made. (2012) 
The Jungle Grows Back: America and Our Imperiled World. (2018) 
 The Ghost at the Feast: America and the Collapse of World Order, 1900-1941 (2023)

See also
Stop Trump movement

Notes

External links

 
 "Toward a Neo-Reaganite Foreign Policy" by William Kristol and Robert Kagan
 Articles at Brookings
 Articles at Weekly Standard
 Articles at Carnegie Endowment
 Foreign Policy Folly by Willian Ruger
 Superpowers don't retire, but Robert Kagan should by Tom Switzer
 'Dangerous Nation' trilogy Book One Review by Michael Lind
 'Dangerous Nation' trilogy Book Two 'The Ghost at the Feast' Review by Thomas Meaney

1958 births
Living people
20th-century American male writers
20th-century American writers
21st-century American writers
American people of Lithuanian-Jewish descent
American political scientists
American University alumni
Carnegie Council for Ethics in International Affairs
Jewish American writers
Harvard Kennedy School alumni
The Washington Post people
Yale College alumni
21st-century American Jews